Burewal  is a village in Kapurthala district of Punjab State, India. The village is administrated by a Sarpanch, who is an elected representative.

Demography 
According to the report published by Census India in 2011, Burewal has a total number of 9 houses and population of 40 of which include 24 males and 16 females. Literacy rate of Burewal is  52.94%, lower than state average of 75.84%.  The population of children under the age of 6 years is 6 which is 15.00% of total population of Burewal, and child sex ratio is approximately  500, lower than state average of 846.

Population data

Air travel connectivity 
The closest airport to the village is Sri Guru Ram Dass Jee International Airport.

Villages in Kapurthala

External links
  Villages in Kapurthala
 Kapurthala Villages List

References

Villages in Kapurthala district